Troy town or Troytown refers to the real or legendary Greek city of Troy in present-day Turkey.

It may also refer to:

Troy Town, a name for various turf mazes in England
Troy Town, West Virginia, an unincorporated community in Logan County, United States
Troytown (horse), an Irish racehorse